Powys Fadog (English: Lower Powys or Madog's Powys) was the northern portion of the former princely realm of Powys, which split in two following the death of Madog ap Maredudd in 1160. The realm was divided under Welsh law, with Madog's nephew Owain Cyfeiliog inheriting the south (see Powys Wenwynwyn) and his son Gruffydd Maelor I, who inherited the north.

Gruffydd received the cantref of Maelor and the commote of Iâl as his portion and later added Nanheudwy, Cynllaith, Glyndyfrdwy and Mochnant Is Rhaeadr. This northern realm became known as Powys Fadog after the accession of his son Madog ap Gruffudd in 1191 who reigned until 1236, and after whom it may be named (see alternative translations above). During his reign, Madog initially adopted a neutral position between Gwynedd and England but by 1215 had settled on an alliance with Llywelyn ab Iorwerth of Gwynedd. This policy of alliance with Gwynedd altered under his successor Gruffudd II over his thirty-three year reign (1236-1269); pressure from an ambitious Gwynedd, and Gruffydd's marriage to the daughter of an English landowner, caused him to seek support from the English king. However, support from England failed to arrive and in 1258 he was forced into an alliance with Llywelyn ap Gruffudd. Gruffydd's influence waned and Llywelyn was recognised as Prince of Wales under the terms of the 1267 Treaty of Montgomery; Gruffydd subsequently confined himself to building his castle at Dinas Brân.

When Gruffydd died in 1269, his eldest son Madog II succeeded to the throne but the small portion of the realm awarded to his younger brothers caused rebellion in which England became engaged. By 1276 Powys Fadog was in disorder with brother fighting brother, and this conflagration soon became a small part in the campaign being waged by the English Crown against the fragile Welsh confederation.

In early 1277 an army led by the Earl of Warwick with support from the treacherous brother of Llywelyn ap Gruffudd, Dafydd ap Gruffydd, marched from Chester into Powys Fadog. Madog II was compelled to submit and under the terms of his surrender the realm would be divided between himself and his younger brother Llywelyn. The royal centre at Castell Dinas Brân, widely considered the strongest native castle in all Wales, was to be had by neither and dismantled.

It appears that Madog II (or at least men loyal to him) remained at Dinas Brân for some time after this accord because the Earl of Lincoln commanded an English force to take the castle on 10 May 1277. Before they could complete their encirclement of the royal centre they learnt that the small garrison inside had abandoned the cause and burnt the castle. Madog II was forced to flee to the protection of Gwynedd. He was killed in battle while campaigning alongside Llywelyn ap Gruffudd later that same year. The castle of Dinas Brân would be reduced, the dramatic ruins of which may still be seen today.

His surviving brothers Llywelyn Fychan and Gruffudd Fychan I accepted the overlordship of England and the realm was divided between them. Special provision was also made for the two sons of Madog II. However, in 1282, during the final campaign of Llywelyn ap Gruffudd, all of the rulers of Powys Fadog would once again turn against England in a final conflict during which Llywelyn ap Gruffudd, Llywelyn Fychan and the two sons of Madog II would die.

Under the terms of the Statute of Rhuddlan in 1284 all of the remaining former princely titles and territories in Wales were abolished. Gruffydd Fychan (the brother of Madog II and last heir to the throne of Powys Fadog) was pardoned but reduced in status to that of a minor local noble or uchelwyr. His direct descendant, Owain Glyndŵr, would become the leader of a later Welsh rebellion in 1400.

The territory of Powys Fadog was broken up into a series of lordships based on the former cantrefi. Under the Laws of Wales Acts these marcher lordships were merged with other adjacent lands formerly part of Gwynedd and incorporated into new administrative counties; the cantrefi of Maelor, Nanheudwy, Iâl, Cynllaith and Mochnant Is Rhaeadr going to Denbighshire and Maelor Saesneg forming the Wrexham exclave of Flintshire. This situation was maintained until the re-organisation of local government in Wales in 1974.

Princes of Powys Fadog and later Lords of Glyn Dyfrdwy
 1160–1191 Gruffydd Maelor
 1191–1236 Madog ap Gruffydd Maelor
 1236–1269 Gruffydd II ap Madog, Lord of Dinas Brân
 1269–1277 Madog II ap Gruffydd, Lord of Dinas Brân
 1277–1289 Gruffydd Fychan I, Lord of Yale and Edernion, which included Glyndyfrdwy
 1289–1304 Madog Crypl, Lord of Glyndyfrdwy and Lord of Cynllaith Owain
 1304–c.1343 Gruffydd of Rhuddalt, Lord of Glyndyfrdwy and Lord of Cynllaith Owain
 c.1343–1369 Gruffydd Fychan II, Lord of Glyndyfrdwy and Lord of Cynllaith Owain
 1369–c.1416 Owain ap Gruffydd, Lord of Glyndyfrdwy and Lord of Cynllaith Owain

Owain ap Gruffydd rose in revolt against the English crown in 1400 and proclaimed himself Prince of Wales. He became more widely known as Owain Glyndŵr. After his death, at least one of his sons survived him, along with one of his brothers, Tudur ap Gruffudd, styled the Lord of Gwyddelwern.

 1416–c.1421?      Maredudd ab Owain Glyndŵr

References
Jacob Youde William Lloyd, The history of the princes, the lords marcher, and the ancient nobility of Powys Fadog, and the ancient lords of Arwystli, Cedewen, and Meirionydd
J. Beverley-Smith, Llywelyn ap Gruffudd, Prince of Wales (1998)
http://www.sewellgenealogy.com/p70.htm#i5288
https://web.archive.org/web/20080709045952/http://freespace.virgin.net/owston.tj/walesprinces.htm
http://www.maximiliangenealogy.co.uk/burke1/Royal%20Descents/hughesofgwerclas_1.htm

1277 disestablishments in Europe
States and territories established in 1160
Kingdoms of Wales
History of Powys
The Lordship of Bromfield and Yale